Kolahjub-e Olya may refer to:
 Kolahjub-e Olya, Ilam
 Kolah Jub-e Olya, Kermanshah